Reeder Township is a township in Adams County, North Dakota, United States. As of the 2010 census, its population was 39.

Reeder Township has one city, Reeder.

References

Townships in Adams County, North Dakota
Townships in North Dakota